What No Man Knows is a 1921 silent film drama produced and directed by Harry Garson and starring Clara Kimball Young.

Cast
Clara Kimball Young as Norma Harvey
Lowell Sherman as Craig Dunlap
Dorothy Wallace as Bertha Dunlap
William P. Carleton as Drake Blackly
Jeanne Carpenter as Mazie
Dulcie Cooper -
Edward M. Kimball - (uncredited)
Arthur Millett - (uncredited)
Rolfe Sedan - (uncredited)

Preservation status
The film survives at the Library of Congress though in a condensed and/or incomplete version.

References

External links
What No Man Knows at IMDb.com

1921 films
American silent feature films
American black-and-white films
Silent American drama films
1921 drama films
Films directed by Harry Garson
1920s American films